Sinapali is the main town in Sinapali Tehsil in the south of Nuapada District in Odisha, India.

The village has a Gram panchayat (local governing council).

Demographics
According to the 2011 Census of India, Sinapali had the following population characteristics:

Males make up 50.3% of Sinapali's population, whereas 49.7% of the population is female.

The main languages spoken in the Sinpali and Nuapada districts are Sambalpuri, Laria. Odia and English is used in schools in Odisha for higher education.

Economy
Sinapali's economy, like the rest of the Nuapada district, depends mainly upon its agricultural and forestry activities. Locals produce non-timber forest products such as the mahua flower, harida, bahada, and tol. Local agriculture is challenging due to limited irrigation facilities (less than 15%, only half of the state average).

References

Cities and towns in Nuapada district
Nuapada district